SS B.F. Jones was a steel-hulled Great Lakes freighter that was named after one of the founders of the Jones and Laughlin Steel Company. She was launched on December 30, 1905 as hull #15. She operated from April 1906 to August 21, 1955 she collided with the steamer Cason J. Callaway. After inspection she was declared a constructive total loss, and scrapped in Duluth, Minnesota.

History
B.F. Jones (U.S. Registry #202839) was a product of the Great Lakes Engineering Works of Ecorse, Michigan for the Interstate Steamship Company (a subsidiary of Jones and Laughlin Steel Company) of Cleveland, Ohio. She was powered by a  triple expansion steam engine and fueled by two coal-fired Scotch marine boilers. She entered service on April 20, 1906. B.H. Jones had a sister ship named .

On October 26, 1924 B.H. Jones rammed the steamer E.A.S. Clarke in heavy fog in the Detroit River near the Great Lakes Engineering Works. E.A.S. Clarke sank almost immediately, with there were no deaths.

On October 23, 1941 B. H. Jones grounded off the east end of Belle Isle in the Detroit River. The tugboats America and Oregon arrived to assist her soon after the grounding. America got caught in the towline of Oregon, capsized and sank in five second into  of water. Six of Americas crew members died. In 1949 the Interstate Steamship Company's fleet merged with their parent company, the Jones and Laughlin Steel Company of Pittsburgh, Pennsylvania.

Her career with Jones and Laughlin lasted only three years. On November 15, 1952 Jones and Laughlin's fleet was sold to the Wilson Transit Company of Cleveland, Ohio (she was re-registered to Wilmington, Delaware).

On August 21, 1955 B.H. Jones was seriously damaged in a collision with the larger steamer Cason J. Callaway, they collided because of heavy fog near Lime Island in the St. Mary's River. After an inspection she was declared a constructive total loss.  She was sold for scrap to the Duluth Iron & Metal Company and scrapped in Duluth, Minnesota. B.H. Joness pilot house, one-piece steel hatch covers and deck crane were transferred to the steamer Sparkman D. Foster.

See also
 
 American Ship Building Company
 Benjamin Franklin Jones (industrialist)
 James H. Laughlin

References

1905 ships
Ships built in Ecorse, Michigan
Great Lakes freighters
Steamships of the United States
Merchant ships of the United States
Maritime incidents in 1924
Maritime incidents in 1955
Ships powered by a triple expansion steam engine